Fred Morrison (born 1963 in Bishopton, Renfrewshire) is a Scottish musician and composer. He has performed professionally on the Great Highland Bagpipes, Scottish smallpipes, Border pipes, low whistle, Northumbrian Smallpipes and uilleann pipes.

He holds the record for the most Macallan/MacCrimmon Trophies at the Lorient festival, having received the trophy ten times. As well as his work as a solo piper, he has played with such bands as Clan Alba and Capercaillie. His albums have been met with critical acclaim.

In 2004 he was voted Instrumentalist of the Year in the Scots Trad Music awards. He has won a number of prizes in the solo Highland Bagpipes circuit.

Morrison's tunes have become popular in the solo piping circuit and the folk scene. Notable are "Passing Places", respectively a lively hornpipe and a low whistle slow air inspired by train rides that Morrison made all over the UK, "Living Uist", "The Lochaber Badger" and the strathspey "Seonaidh's Tune" that he composed for his son.

Morrison is also the founder and designer of Fred Morrison Pipes, a brand producing Highland bagpipes, Border pipes and Scottish small pipes.

Discography 
Solo albums
 The Broken Chanter (1993)
 The Sound of the Sun (2000)
 Outlands (2009)

Fred Morrison and Jamie McMenemy
 Up South (2003)

Fred Morrison Trio
 Live at the Glasgow Royal Concert Hall (2015)

Various artists including Fred Morrison
 Celtic Colours (1998)
 Piping Up (2000)

References

External links 
 FredMorrison.com

1963 births
Great Highland bagpipe players
Uilleann pipers from Scotland
Living people
People from Renfrewshire
People educated at St Aloysius' College, Glasgow
Players of border pipes
Tin whistle players
People from Bishopton